Michael Eugene Augustyniak (born July 17, 1956) is a former American football running back in the National Football League who played for the New York Jets. He played college football for the Purdue Boilermakers, where he was member of the 1978 Peach Bowl Champions and the 1979 Bluebonnet Bowl Champions.  While he was undrafted out of college; he ultimately signed with the New York Jets, reaching the 1982 AFC Title Game (aka The "Mud Bowl")

He was inducted into the Indiana Football Hall of Fame in October, 2017.

References

1956 births
Living people
American football fullbacks
New Orleans Saints players
New York Jets players
Purdue Boilermakers football players